Kanye Airport  is an airport serving the town of Kanye, Botswana.

See also

Transport in Botswana
List of airports in Botswana

References

External links
OpenStreetMap - Kanye
OurAirports - Kanye
Fallingrain - Kanye Airport

Airports in Botswana